Prolactin-inducible protein also known as gross cystic disease fluid protein 15 (GCDFP-15), extra-parotid glycoprotein (EP-GP), gp17 seminal actin-binding protein (SABP)  or BRST2 is a protein that in humans is encoded by the PIP gene. It is upregulated by prolactin and androgens and downregulated by estrogen.

Function 

The protein has a physiological function in regulation of water transport mainly in apocrine glands in the axilla, vulva, eyelid and ear canal, serous cells of the submandibular salivary gland, serous cells of the submucosal glands of the bronchi, and accessory lacrimal glands  as well as cutaneous eccrine glands. It is also found in amniotic fluid and seminal fluid.
 
PIP has the ability to bind  immunoglobulin G (IgG), IgG-Fc, CD4-T cell receptor suggesting a wide range of immunological functions. PIP also binds to AZGP1. PIP exerts aspartyl proteinase activity able to cleave fibronectin.

PIP can bind different species of bacteria showing highest affinity to streptococci thus playing a role in non-immune defense of the body against pathogenic bacterial strains.

Mitogenic effect of PIP was observed on both normal and malignant breast epithelial cells.

Use as marker and significance in disease 

Prolactin induced protein (called GCDFP-15 in this context) in breast cyst fluid or breast tissue serves as marker of both benign and malignant apocrine metaplasia as the protein is not normally expressed in breast tissue. It is characteristic of low grade apocrine carcinoma of the breast, high grade apocrine carcinoma frequently lose expression of this marker.
PIP gene expression in breast cancer lines was associated with decreased cell proliferation and invasiveness and an increase of the apoptotic pathway. Many of the genes affected by PIP appear to be regulated by STAT5.

A mitogenic effect of this protein on experimental breast cells lines MCF10A, MCF7, BT474, MDA-MB231 and T47D  was detected. Prolactin-induced protein has also been used for identification and detection of disseminated breast cancer cells.

The PIP gene is amplified in some breast cancer lines accounting for some of its overexpression, however additional mechanisms are needed to completely explain its overexpression.
In T47D breast cancer cells, androgen receptor and RUNX2 interact to synergistically enhance PIP expression.

In molecular apocrine breast cancer (ER-/AR+) there is a positive feedback loop between androgen receptor and extracellular signal-regulated kinase (ERK) via CREB1 which can be inhibited by anti-androgens. PIP expression is necessary for viability and invasiveness of this subtype of breast cancer.

In ER+ breast cancer, particularly those with very high level of ER expression, PIP appears to play an important role in proliferation and invasion as well as acquired resistance to tamoxifen.

References

Further reading

External links 
BRST2 immunostaining - abcam.com.
GCDFP-15 immunostaining - immunosaver.com.

Staining
Cutaneous conditions